The Wangi-wangi white-eye (Zosterops paruhbesar), is a species of songbird in the white-eye family. Zosterops paruhbesar has a near full yellow body with the head, throat, vent and mid vental stripe. The flanks are slightly grey and the flight feathers and tail feathers are brown. Around the eye of Zosterops paruhbesar is a ring of white feathers. 

This species is endemic to a single island named Wangi-wangi Island around the Wakatobi Islands, Indonesia. In contrast, most species in the genus Zosterops inhabit areas  from Z. paruhbesar.

References 

Birds of Indonesia
Birds by country
Birds described in 2022
paruhbesar